The Alford–Nielson Home, is the only example of Second Empire French Victorian Architecture in Ferndale, Humboldt County, California.

History
In 1874, James E. Brown built what is now the back part of this house at a different location, 421 Main Street, in the current Main Street historical district.

William B. Alford (1851-1921) a local pharmacist after whom the house is named, arrived in Humboldt County at age 21 in 1872 and moved to Ferndale in 1875 where he jointly owned a drugstore with his brother Frank A. Alford, M.D. immediately adjoining the former location of this house in the Main Street district.

Dr. Alford married Mary Richmond  in San Jose, California in 1877; the Second Empire French Style front building was added in the same year.

In June 1893, the property was purchased by furniture dealer H.J. Mueller (1864-1900) who moved the house with the Alford family in residence to 1299 Main Street.  Six months later, the Alfords moved out and the Mueller family moved in.  The Muellers put an addition to the house in February 1896.  The house and furnishings were purchased by Ed Mowry in August, 1903 and the Muellers moved to Livermore, California.

The next owner, Maurice Nielson, lived there fifty-five years to 1977. He was one of the developers of modern creamery operations in Humboldt County.   Neilson was followed by a couple who started and finished a seven-year restoration then sold the house to Tom and Maura Eastman who filed for the home to be added to the National Register of Historic Places.  It was accepted at 112 years of age on 23 January 1986.

The home sustained significant damage and fell off its footing in the 1992 Cape Mendocino earthquakes, but was restored.

References

External links
 
 

Victorian architecture in California
Houses on the National Register of Historic Places in California
Buildings and structures in Ferndale, California
Houses in Humboldt County, California
National Register of Historic Places in Humboldt County, California
Houses completed in 1874
Houses completed in 1877